Datuk Junz Wong Hong Jun is a Malaysian politician who has served as Member of the Sabah State Legislative Assembly (MLA) for Tanjung Aru since May 2018. He served as the State Minister of Agriculture and Food Industries of Sabah in the Heritage Party (WARISAN) administration under former Chief Minister Shafie Apdal from May 2018 to the collapse of the WARISAN administration in September 2020 and MLA for Likas from May 2013 to May 2018. He is a member and the Vice President of the WARISAN and was a member of the Democratic Action Party (DAP), a component party of the Pakatan Harapan (PH) and formerly Pakatan Rakyat (PR) coalitions.

Election results

Honours 
 
  Commander of the Order of Kinabalu (PGDK) - Datuk (2018)

References

Living people
Government ministers of Malaysia
Sabah Heritage Party politicians
1980 births